BLIS or Blis may refer to:
 Bachelor of Library Science or Bachelor of Library and Information Science degree
 Blind Spot Information System in automobiles
 Bilkent Laboratory and International School in Ankara, Turkey
 Bacteriocin-like Inhibitory Substances, produced by some strains of Streptococcus salivarius
 BLIS (software), BLAS-like Library Instantiation Software
 Bitame Lucia International School, preschool and primary school near Yaoundé, Cameroon

Other uses 
 BLIS/COBOL, a computer operating system
 Blis-et-Born, a commune in southwestern France

See also
 Bliss (disambiguation)